The 21st European Athletics Junior Championships were held between 21 and 24 July 2011 in the Kadriorg Stadium in Tallinn, Estonia.

Russia topped the medal table with 18 medals overall, including 8 golds, ahead of Germany and Great Britain.

Men's results

Women's results

Medal table

Participating nations 
954 athletes from 47 countries participating in championships.

 (1)
 
 (2)
 
 
 (1)
 
 
 
 
 
 (host)
 
 
 (1)
 (5)
 
 
 
 
 (2)
 
 (8)
 
 (14)
 (1)
 (26)
 (2)
 (1)
 (1)
 (3)
 (3)
 
 
 
 
 
 
 (1)

References

 
European Athletics Junior Championships
Athletics Junior Championships
European Athletics Junior Championships
2011 in Estonian sport
European Athletics Junior Championships
21st century in Tallinn